Bobby Joseph Wagner (born June 27, 1990) is an American football inside linebacker who is a free agent. He played college football at Utah State and was drafted in the second round of the 2012 NFL Draft by the Seattle Seahawks, who he played for until the end of the  season.

High school career
Wagner attended Colony High School in Ontario, California, where he played high school football for the Titans. In 2007, he registered 125 tackles (92 solo, 33 assists), including four sacks as a senior. He also played tight end, tallying 37 catches for 595 yards with 11 touchdowns. He received all-CIF Central Division honors as well as all-Mount Baldy League accolades. He earned second-team California Division 2 all-state honors after helping lead the Titans to a CIF division title and was named to the All-San Bernardino County team.

Considered  only a two-star recruit by Rivals.com, Wagner's only offer came from Utah State, which he accepted.

College career
Wagner attended Utah State University from 2008 to 2011. A four-year starter, he recorded 445 tackles, 4.5 sacks, and four interceptions during his career. As a senior in 2011, Wagner was the WAC Defensive Player of the Year after recording 147 tackles, four sacks, and two interceptions.

College statistics

Professional career
On January 14, 2012, it was announced that Wagner had accepted his invitation to play in the 2012 Senior Bowl. He became the first Utah State player to play in the game since Chris Cooley in 2004. On January 28, 2012, Wagner played in the Senior Bowl and recorded 22 combined tackles and an interception for Minnesota Vikings' head coach Leslie Frazier's North team that defeated the South 23–13. He was named the Senior Bowl MVP and was also named the North's Most Outstanding Player. Wagner received an invitation to the NFL Scouting Combine, but was unable to attend after coming down with pneumonia. On March 30, 2012, Wagner attended Utah State's pro day and impressed scouts and team representatives after performing all of the combine drills. He displayed his versatility and athleticism throughout his workout and helped solidify himself as a top linebacker. His 40-yard dash and broad jump would've finished first among all linebackers in at the NFL combine and his vertical would've tied with Cal's Mychal Kendricks for first. His broad jump was five inches better than any linebacker at the combine and would've finished third among all positions. At the conclusion of the pre-draft process, Wagner was projected to be a second round pick by NFL draft experts and scouts. He was ranked the fourth best outside linebacker in the draft by NFLDraftScout.com.

Seattle Seahawks
The Seattle Seahawks selected Wagner in the second round (47th overall) of the 2012 NFL Draft. He is the 11th highest player selected in the NFL draft from Utah State and the highest since Rulon Jones in 1980. The Seattle Seahawks also drafted his Utah State teammate Robert Turbin in the fourth round.

On May 7, 2012, the Seattle Seahawks signed Wagner to a four-year, $4.30 million contract that includes $2.51 million guaranteed and a signing bonus of $1.57 million.

2012

Wagner entered training camp competing for the vacant starting middle linebacker role against Barrett Ruud and Matt McCoy. Although Ruud was initially supposed to replace David Hawthorne, an injury sidelined him during organized team activities, giving Wagner valuable time with the first team defense. Head coach Pete Carroll named Wagner the starting middle linebacker, along with outside linebackers K. J. Wright and Leroy Hill, to start the regular season.

He made his professional regular season debut and first career start in the Seattle Seahawks' season-opener at the Arizona Cardinals and recorded four combined tackles during their 20–16 loss. In Week 5, Wagner recorded five combined tackles and made his first career sack on Cam Newton in the Seahawks' 16–12 victory. The next week, he made a season-high 14 combined tackles in a 24–23 victory against the New England Patriots. On November 25, 2012, Wagner recorded nine combined tackles, two pass deflections, and intercepted his first career pass off Miami Dolphins' quarterback Ryan Tannehill during a 24–21 loss. On December 9, 2012, he collected eight combined tackles, two pass deflections, and intercepted two passes off of John Skelton in a 58–0 routing against the Arizona Cardinals. Wagner finished his rookie season with 140 combined tackles (87 solo), four pass deflections, three interceptions. and two sacks in 16 games and 15 starts. Pro Football Focus ranked him the second best inside linebacker in 2012 and the best rookie linebacker during the season.

The Seattle Seahawks finished second in the NFC West with an 11–5 record and received a playoff berth. On January 6, 2013, Wagner started in his first career playoff game and recorded nine combined tackles during a 24–14 victory at the Washington Redskins in the NFC Wild Card Round. They were eliminated by the Atlanta Falcons in the Divisional Round.

2013: Super Bowl championship

Wagner remained the starting middle linebacker to start the 2013 regular season under new defensive coordinator Dan Quinn. On September 22, 2013, he recorded nine combined tackles, deflected a pass, and intercepted Chad Henne as the Seahawks defeated the Jacksonville Jaguars and Seattle's former defensive coordinator Gus Bradley 45–17, who became the Jaguars head coach in 2013. Wagner missed the first two games of his career (Weeks 6–7) after suffering a high ankle sprain. In Week 9, Wagner collected 11 combined tackles and was credited with 1.5 sacks on Mike Glennon during a 27–24 win over the Tampa Bay Buccaneers. On December 29, 2013, he made a season-high 12 combined tackles during a 27–9 victory against the St. Louis Rams. He finished the season with 120 combined tackles (72 solo), seven pass deflections, five sacks, and two interceptions in 14 games and 14 starts. Pro Football Focus ranked Wagner the 61st best player in the league in 2013, regardless of position.

The Seattle Seahawks finished the season atop their division with a 13–3 record. On January 19, 2014, Wagner started in the NFC Championship and recorded 15 combined tackles during a 23–17 victory over the San Francisco 49ers. On February 2, 2014, Wagner started in his first career Super Bowl and made ten combined tackles as the Seahawks routed the Denver Broncos 43–8 and won Super Bowl XLVIII.

2014: Back-to-back Super Bowl appearances

Wagner, K. J. Wright, and Bruce Irvin returned as the starting linebacker corps in 2014. Wagner started the Seattle Seahawks' season-opener against the Green Bay Packers and recorded a season-high 14 combined tackles during a 36–16 victory on Thursday Night Football. Unfortunately, he missed five games (Weeks 7–11) after suffering turf toe. On December 14, 2014, Wagner recorded his fourth game with at least ten combined tackles and sacked Colin Kaepernick during a 17–7 victory over the San Francisco 49ers. Wagner finished the  season with 104 combined tackles (67 solo), nine tackles for a loss, three pass deflections, and two sacks in 11 games and 11 starts. Even though he missed five  games, he was voted into his first Pro Bowl and was named First Team All-Pro. For the third straight season, the Seattle Seahawks' defense finished first in the NFL in points allowed, making Wagner a key starter on the top defense every year of his career so far. For his efforts that season, he received a single MVP vote from Tony Dungy, largely due to the Seahawks allowing 20.4 points per game without Wagner and 6.5 points per game in the six games after he returned from an injury.

On February 1, 2015, the Seattle Seahawks played in Super Bowl XLIX after defeating the Carolina Panthers in the Divisional Round and then the Green Bay Packers in the NFC Championship. Wagner recorded 12 combined tackles, deflected a pass, and intercepted a pass attempt by Tom Brady in the Seahawks 28–24 last-second loss to the New England Patriots. Wagner made the NFL Top 100 Players for the first time in his career after he garnered enough votes from his NFL peers to finish ranked 69th in the NFL Top 100 Players of 2015.

2015

On August 2, 2015, the Seattle Seahawks signed Wagner to a four-year, $43 million contract extension that includes $19.97 million guaranteed and a signing bonus of $8 million.

Irvin, Wright, and Wagner remained the starters under new defensive coordinator Kris Richard to begin 2015. On October 11, 2015, Wagner recorded seven combined tackles, a pass deflection and a fumble recovery, and scored his first career touchdown during a 27–24 overtime loss to the Cincinnati Bengals. Defensive end Michael Bennett caused Bengals' running back Rex Burkhead to fumble in the third quarter, which Wagner recovered and returned it 23 yards for a touchdown. Wagner missed the Seahawks' Week 6 loss to the Carolina Panthers with a pectoral strain. In Week 10, Wagner collected 11 combined tackles, deflected a pass, recovered a fumble, and scored his second touchdown of the season, as the Seahawks lost to the Arizona Cardinals, 39–32. In the fourth quarter of that game, linebacker K. J. Wright sacked quarterback Carson Palmer for a nine-yard loss and jarred the ball loose resulting in a fumble. Wagner recovered the fumble and returned it for a 22-yard touchdown. On November 29, 2015, he tied his season-high of 12 combined tackles and deflected a pass in Seattle's 39–30 victory over the Pittsburgh Steelers.

He finished the  season with 114 combined tackles (67 solo) and seven pass deflections, and was credited with only half a sack in 15 games and 15 starts. This marked his first and only season without a solo sack. Wagner finished second on the team in tackles, falling two behind leader K. J. Wright. He was voted to the 2016 Pro Bowl and was named to The Associated Press All-Pro second team. Pro Football Focus ranked Wagner the 30th-best linebacker in 2015. His teammate K. J. Wright was ranked the sixth-best linebacker by PFF and Bruce Irvin was ranked 15th. 

The Seattle Seahawks finished second in the NFC West with a 10–6 record. They went on to defeat the Minnesota Vikings, 10–9, in the NFC Wild Card Round and then lost, 31–24, to the Carolina Panthers in the Divisional Round as Wagner recorded 13 combined tackles. On January 31, 2016, Wagner played in his first Pro Bowl game and recorded ten combined tackles to help Team Irvin defeat Team Rice, 49–27, and win the 2016 Pro Bowl.

2016

Wagner and Wright returned to their respective starting roles in 2016 and were joined by Mike Morgan, who was chosen to replace Bruce Irvin following his departure in free agency to the Oakland Raiders.

On September 25, 2016, Wagner recorded six combined, two pass deflections, and intercepted a pass by Blaine Gabbert during a 37–18 victory over the San Francisco 49ers. In Week 9, Wagner made a career-high 16 combined tackles in Seattle's 31–25 win against the Buffalo Bills. During a Week 16 matchup against the Arizona Cardinals, he set the single-season franchise record in combined tackles after he surpassed Terry Beeson's record of 153 tackles. On January 1, 2017, Wright recorded 12 combined tackles, a pass deflection, and sacked Colin Kaepernick twice in a 25–23 victory at the San Francisco 49ers. Wagner finished the  season as the Seahawks' leading tackler for the third consecutive season with a career-high 167 combined tackles (85 solo), 4.5 sacks, three pass deflections, and an interception in 16 games and 16 starts. He led the NFL in tackles, was named to his third consecutive Pro Bowl, and was voted First-team All-Pro. The Seahawks finished with a 10–5–1 record and won the NFC West. In the Wild Card Round against the Detroit Lions, he had ten total tackles in the 26–6 victory. In the Divisional Round loss to the Atlanta Falcons, he had eight combined tackles. He was ranked 39th by his peers on the NFL Top 100 Players of 2017. Pro Football Focus gave Wagner an overall grade of 90.8 in 2016, finishing third among linebackers behind Jerrell Freeman (93.9) and Luke Kuechly (93.1).

2017

On September 17, 2017, he recorded seven combined tackles, deflected two passes, and made his first interception of the season off of a pass by Brian Hoyer during a 12–9 win over the San Francisco 49ers. On November 5, 2017, Wagner recorded a season-high 12 combined tackles, deflected a pass, and sacked Washington Redskins' quarterback Kirk Cousins for the first safety of his career in the Seahawks' 17–14 loss. He finished the  season with 133 combined tackles (97 solo), six pass deflections, two interceptions, 1.5 sacks, and a safety in 16 games and 16 starts. On December 19, 2017, Wagner was named to his fourth straight Pro Bowl. The Seattle Seahawks finished second in the NFC West with a 9–7 record and for that did not qualify for the playoffs for the first time during Wagner's time with the team. Pro Football Focus gave Wagner an overall grade of 96.7 which was ranked the best grade among all linebackers. He earned First Team All-Pro and Pro Bowl nominations for the 2017 season. He was ranked No. 21 by his fellow players on the NFL Top 100 Players of 2018.

Wagner was the recipient of the 2017 Steve Largent Award, which is given annually to the team contributor best exemplifying the spirit, dedication, and integrity of former Seahawk wide receiver Steve Largent.

2018

On December 2, Wagner logged 12 combined tackles, one sack, two tackles for loss, and two takeaways near the goal line in a 43–16 home win over the San Francisco 49ers. For his first takeaway, in the second quarter, he forced a fumble from Jeffery Wilson at the Seahawk 5-yard line, recovered it at the 3, and returned it 11 yards to the 14. Later, in the fourth quarter, he intercepted a pass from Nick Mullens at the 2-yard line and ran it back 98 yards for a touchdown, his first career pick six, to set the Seahawk franchise record for longest play. He earned NFC Defensive Player of the Week honors for his game against San Francisco. On December 10, against the Minnesota Vikings, Wagner was a part of many key third and fourth down stops as well as blocking a field goal by kicker Dan Bailey. The block proved to be controversial with the NFL eventually saying he should have been called for a penalty after using his teammates for leverage. Wagner was named first-team All Pro along with teammate Michael Dickson. The Seahawks finished second in the NFC West and made the playoffs as the No. 5-seed. In the Wild Card Round loss to the Dallas Cowboys, he had five total tackles. He was named to the Pro Bowl and earned First Team All-Pro. He was ranked 15th by his fellow players on the NFL Top 100 Players of 2019.

2019

On July 26, 2019, Wagner signed a three-year, $54 million contract extension with the Seahawks through the 2022 season with $40.2 million guaranteed, making him the highest-paid middle linebacker in the league. In Week 3 against the New Orleans Saints, Wagner recorded a team high 18 tackles in the 33–27 loss. In Week 7 against the Baltimore Ravens, Wagner recorded a team high 13 tackles in the 30–16 loss. In Week 8 against the Atlanta Falcons, Wagner recorded a sack on Matt Schaub and recovered a fumble lost by Devonta Freeman in the 27–20 win. In Week 9 against the Tampa Bay Buccaneers, Wagner recorded a team high 11 tackles and sacked Jameis Winston once in the 40–34 overtime win. In Week 15 against the Carolina Panthers, Wagner recorded his first interception of the season off a pass thrown by Kyle Allen during the 30–24 win. In Week 16 against the Arizona Cardinals, Wagner recorded a team high 13 tackles and sacked Kyler Murray once during the 27–13 loss. He was named to the Pro Bowl and earned First Team All-Pro honors for the 2019 season. He was ranked 13th by his fellow players on the NFL Top 100 Players of 2020.

2020

In Week 8 against the San Francisco 49ers, Wagner recorded a team high 11 tackles and sacked Jimmy Garoppolo twice during the 37–27 win. On November 4, 2020, Wagner was named the NFC Defensive Player of the Week for his performance in Week 8. He earned Pro Bowl and First Team All-Pro honors. He was ranked 25th by his fellow players on the NFL Top 100 Players of 2021.

In the Wild Card Round of the playoffs against the Los Angeles Rams, Wagner led the team with 16 tackles (11 solo) and sacked John Wolford once during the 30–20 loss.

2021: Final year in Seattle

Following the 2021 season, Wagner was named second-team All Pro which ended his five-season streak of first-team All-Pro selections. He earned an eighth consecutive Pro Bowl nomination. He was ranked 29th by his fellow players on the NFL Top 100 Players of 2022.

On March 9, 2022, Wagner was released after 10 seasons with the Seahawks.

Los Angeles Rams
Wagner signed a five-year contract worth up to $65 million with the Los Angeles Rams on March 31, 2022.

The Rams released Wagner after a mutual agreement on February 23, 2023.

NFL career statistics

Regular season

Postseason

Awards and highlights

NFL
 Super Bowl champion (XLVIII)
 6× First-team All-Pro (2014, 2016–2020)
 3× Second-team All-Pro (2015, 2021, 2022)
 8× Pro Bowl (2014–2021)
 2× NFL tackles leader
 NFL 2010s All-Decade Team
 PFWA All-Rookie Team (2012)

College
 3× First-team All-WAC (2009–2011)
 Senior Bowl MVP (2012)

References

External links
Los Angeles Rams bio
Utah State Aggies bio

1990 births
Living people
African-American players of American football
American football linebackers
Los Angeles Rams players
National Conference Pro Bowl players
People from Ontario, California
Players of American football from Los Angeles
Seattle Seahawks players
Sportspeople from San Bernardino County, California
Unconferenced Pro Bowl players
Utah State Aggies football players